Chrysolepis is a genus of prehistoric lobe-finned fish that lived during the Late Devonian period.

References 

 Lebedav, O. A., 1983, A new Crossopterygian Fish from the Central Devonian Region: Paleontological Journal, v. 16, part 4, p. 63-70. (Chrysolepis orlensis)

External links
 Tetrapodomorpha - Terrestrial vertebrate-like sarcopterygians on Mikko's Phylogeny Archive

Prehistoric lobe-finned fish genera
Devonian bony fish
Late Devonian animals
Late Devonian fish